The Capuchin Church in Vienna, Austria, is a Catholic church and monastery run by the Order of Friars Minor Capuchin. Located on the Neuer Markt square in the Innere Stadt near the Hofburg Palace, the Capuchin Church is most famous for containing the Imperial Crypt, the final resting place for members of the House of Habsburg. The official name is the Church of Saint Mary of the Angels.

History
About 1599 the Capuchin brothers under Lawrence of Brindisi resided at Vienna on their way to Prague, where they had been sent by Pope Clement VIII in the course of the Counter-Reformation. The church was donated by will of Anna of Tyrol (1585–1618), consort of Holy Roman Emperor Matthias of Habsburg. Construction was delayed due to the outbreak of the Thirty Years' War and not finished until 1632, under the rule of Matthias' successor Ferdinand II. It was consecrated in 1632.

The aisleless church contains the tombs of friar Marco d'Aviano (d. 1699) and architect Donato Felice d'Allio (1761) as well as a pietà by Peter Strudel. Its subterranean mausoleum is the Imperial Crypt (though usually called Capuchin Crypt) that has been the principal place of entombment for the Habsburg dynasty, Emperors of the Holy Roman Empire, and their descendants.

The lying in repose for the last heir to the Austrian and Hungarian throne, Otto von Habsburg, took place in a side chapel on 15 July 2011.

The façade of the Capuchin Church building was restored in 2016, removing the line dividing the colors, and strengthening the colors.

Imperial Crypt

The Capuchin Church contains the Imperial Crypt, also called the Capuchin Crypt (Kapuzinergruft), a burial chamber beneath the church and monastery. Since 1633, the Imperial Crypt has been the principal place of entombment for members of the House of Habsburg. The bodies of 145 Habsburg royalty, plus urns containing the hearts or cremated remains of four others, are deposited here, including 12 emperors and 18 empresses. The most recent entombment was in 2011. The visible 107 metal sarcophagi and five heart urns range in style from puritan plain to exuberant rococo. Some of the dozen resident Capuchin friars continue their customary role as the guardians and caretakers of the crypt, along with their other pastoral work in Vienna.

Gallery

References
Citations

Bibliography

External links

Official website
Capuchin Crypt
Concerts at Capuchin Church

Roman Catholic churches completed in 1632
Roman Catholic church buildings in the Vicariate of Vienna City
Buildings and structures in Innere Stadt
Churches used by the Priestly Fraternity of St. Peter
1632 establishments in Austria
17th-century Roman Catholic church buildings in Austria